Calamotropha unicolorellus is a moth in the family Crambidae. It was described by Zeller in 1863. It is found in the Himalayas.

References

Crambinae
Moths described in 1863